Lunt is a surname. Notable people with the surname include:

Alfred Lunt (1892–1977), an American stage director and actor
Alphonso M. Lunt (1837–1917), an American soldier
Dolly Lunt Burge, of the historic Burge Plantation, Georgia, United States
Evered Lunt (1900–1982), an English Anglican bishop
Geoffrey Lunt (1885–1948), an English Anglican bishop
George Lunt (1803–1885), an American editor, lawyer, author, and politician
Horace Lunt (1918–2010), an American linguist
James Lunt (1917–2001), a British Army officer and military historian
Kenny Lunt (born 1979), an English retired professional footballer 
Laurel Lunt Prussing (born 1941), an American politician
Michael Lunt (1935–2007), an English amateur golfer
Shaun Lunt (born 1987), an English professional rugby league footballer
Tom Lunt, an American music producer
Wes Lunt (born 1993), an American football quarterback
Wilbur Fisk Lunt (1848–1908), an American attorney

See also 
Lunts